Høllen is a village in Lindesnes municipality in Agder county, Norway.

Høllen was the administrative centre of the old municipality of Spangereid which existed from 1889 until 1965. The village is also known as Spangereid since it was the centre of Spangereid for nearly a century and prior to that it was the seat of the parish of Spangereid since Spangereid Church is located in Høllen.

In 2007, the Spangereid Canal was completed through the centre of Høllen. The canal connects the Lenesfjorden to the North Sea.

The area is one of Norway's richest archaeological sites. The abundant remnants from the Bronze Age and Viking Age show the Spangereid was a very important place at that time. Today, the village is a popular tourist destination for Norwegians and Europeans alike.

Photo gallery

References

Villages in Agder
Lindesnes
Archaeological sites in Norway